A Data Learn the Language is the third studio album by American post-rock band The Mercury Program, released in 2002 on Tiger Style Records.  Allmusic called it "consistently melodic, rhythmically varied, and unfailingly listenable."

Track listing

References

2002 albums
The Mercury Program albums